Old Rag Mountain is a  mountain near Sperryville in Madison County, Virginia. A part of the Blue Ridge Mountains, the peak is located within Shenandoah National Park and is the most popular hiking destination within the park. 

In contrast to most mountains of the Blue Ridge, Old Rag has an exposed (rocky) summit.

Geology
Old Rag Mountain is underlain by Old Rag Granite, named for its ubiquitous exposure on the mountain, formed during the Grenville Orogeny about a billion years ago. About 400 million years after the Grenville orogeny during the Catoctin Formation, deposition of basaltic magma occurred during the formation of the Iapetus Ocean, forming a layer of greenstone over the granite. This was followed by the Weverton Formation, Harpers Formation, and Antietam formation in which sand and rock sedimented on the ocean floor forming quartzite and sandstone deposits. Finally a period of sedimentation of shells and skeletons of foraminifera resulted in deposition of a layer of limestone. Approximately 700 million years after the Grenville Orogeny, the Iapetus Ocean began to close resulting in the Alleghenian Orogeny when the Old Rag Granite and layers of rock deposited upon it were transported westward and eventually thrust up over the limestone bed around it, forming Old Rag and the Blue Ridge Mountains.

Recreation

Hiking 

The summit of Old Rag is accessible via a system of trails in Shenandoah National Park. The shorter, most common way is from a parking area in Nethers near the end of Madison County's SR 601, off Virginia State Route 231, at the base of the mountain. A  circuit hike or a  out-and-back hike to the summit can be made. The circuit hike makes use of the Ridge Trail which ascends the mountain  to the first false summit. The Fire Road then descends  to the Old Rag parking area.

The upper Old Rag parking area was closed to public vehicles in 2010. Parking is now limited to the lower field parking area, adding a  walk on asphalt.

The summit can also be reached from Skyline Drive by following Old Rag Fire Road from the drive at milepost 43 to its eastern terminus with the Saddle Trail and then follow that trail to the summit.

Rock climbing 
Old Rag is a unique destination for rock climbing in the mid-Atlantic region. Its large granite exposures offer rock climbers an experience similar to that provided by the granite rocks of the Sierra Nevada, Yosemite, North Carolina, and New Hampshire. It boasts splitter cracks, dihedrals, and crystal pinching slabs.

Bouldering 
Old Rag has a rather underdeveloped bouldering section. However, because Old Rag has an exposed surface, bouldering challenges exist all along the trail.

References

External links 

 
 
 
 

Mountains of Shenandoah National Park
Blue Ridge Mountains
Mountains of Madison County, Virginia
Tourist attractions in Madison County, Virginia